Olivia Colman is an English actress who has received various awards and nominations, including an Academy Award, three Golden Globe Awards, two Screen Actors Guild Awards, a British Academy Film Award, three British Academy Television Awards, a Primetime Emmy Award, and two Critics' Choice Awards. She was appointed Commander of the Order of the British Empire (CBE) in the 2019 Birthday Honours for services to drama.

In 2011, she received critical acclaim for her performance in the drama film Tyrannosaur, and was nominated for the Satellite Award for Best Actress – Motion Picture and won the BIFA Award for Best Actress. From 2013 to 2017, she starred in the serial crime drama series Broadchurch, for which she won the British Academy Television Award for Best Actress and was nominated for the International Emmy Award for Best Actress. For her role in the miniseries The Night Manager (2016), she won the Golden Globe Award for Best Supporting Actress – Series, Miniseries or Television Film and was nominated for the Primetime Emmy Award for Outstanding Supporting Actress in a Limited Series or Movie. For her performance in the comedy series Fleabag (2016–2019), she was nominated for the Primetime Emmy Award for Outstanding Supporting Actress in a Comedy Series. For her portrayal of Queen Elizabeth II in the Netflix period drama series The Crown (2019–2020), she received the Golden Globe Award for Best Actress – Television Series Drama and the Primetime Emmy Award for Outstanding Lead Actress in a Drama Series.

Colman has collaborated twice with Yorgos Lanthimos. She first starred in the black comedy film The Lobster (2015), for which she won the BIFA Award for Best Supporting Actress. She then starred as Anne, Queen of Great Britain in the historical comedy drama film The Favourite (2018). For her performance in the latter, she won the Academy Award for Best Actress, BAFTA Award for Best Actress in a Leading Role, the BIFA Award for Best Performance by an Actress in a British Independent Film, the Critics' Choice Movie Award for Best Actress in a Comedy, the Golden Globe Award for Best Actress – Motion Picture Comedy or Musical, the Satellite Award for Best Actress – Motion Picture Comedy or Musical, the Volpi Cup for Best Actress, and was nominated for the Screen Actors Guild Award for Outstanding Performance by a Female Actor in a Leading Role.

For her performance in the drama film The Father (2020), Colman received nominations for numerous awards, including the Golden Globe Award, Screen Actors Guild Award, Critics' Choice Movie Award, and the Academy Award for Best Supporting Actress. For her performance in the psychological drama film The Lost Daughter (2021), she received nominations for the Golden Globe Award, Screen Actors Guild Award, and Academy Award for Best Actress, amongst others.

Major associations

Academy Awards

BAFTA Awards

Emmy Awards

Golden Globe Awards

Screen Actors Guild Awards

Venice Film Festival

Other awards

AACTA International Awards

British Independent Film Awards

Critics' Choice Awards

European Film Awards

Gotham Awards

Satellite Awards

Other awards and nominations

References

External links
 

Colman, Olivia